The Sioux Falls Stampede are a Tier I junior ice hockey team based in Sioux Falls, South Dakota. The Stampede are members of the Western Conference of the United States Hockey League (USHL). The team plays home games at the Denny Sanford Premier Center, the largest facility in capacity and size in the USHL. The team was established in 1999 and is owned by Sioux Falls Sports LLC.

The Stampede have qualified for the Clark Cup playoffs in fifteen of twenty seasons. The team holds three Clark Cup championships, winning most recently in the 2018–19 season, two conference and one division championships, and was awarded the Anderson Cup in the 2005–06 season for the league's highest win percentage. The organization holds the USHL single-season attendance record at 200,597 fans over the 2015–16 season and are a five-time USHL organization of the year recipient. Thirty-five former players have skated in the National Hockey League (NHL).

History

Foundation
Discussions began as early as 1994 to bring a United States Hockey League (USHL) expansion to the city of Sioux Falls. Expansion talks failed on three separate occasions, including a bid by Wisconsin Capitols owner Geoffrey Kelley to relocate to Sioux Falls, due to the city's failure to provide a permanent home and publicly-backed funds. The Minnehaha Ice and Recreation Center and Expo Ice Arena at the W.H. Lyon Fairgrounds were in contention to host the team, however, both lacked sufficient locker rooms or accommodations for fans to meet league demands. The Sioux Falls Arena was also presented as an option, but was written off due to poor sight lines and potential scheduling conflicts with other tenants.

In 1998, the Minnesota-based investment firm Central Ventures, Inc. expressed interest in adding a USHL team to the Sioux Falls sports landscape. The firm and local investment group Sioux Falls Sports, LLC. made an official proposal on January 26, 1998, to the league at its annual board of governors meeting held in Lincoln, Nebraska. Unlike other proposals, the investment firm was willing to help privately fund improvements at an existing facility or the construction of a new arena with help from the city.

On May 26, 1998, league president Gino Gasparini awarded Sioux Falls a franchise to begin play in September 1999. The city finalized a deal that would upgrade the existing Sioux Falls Arena for an estimated $1 million funded between the city and team. In choosing the team name, the ownership group set up a telephone line fans called to make suggestions. On September 30, 1998, after more than 140 name submissions were filed, the official name Stampede and American bison logo were unveiled to represent the new Sioux Falls franchise.

First seasons and early struggles: 1999–2005
On October 7, 1998, former Miami University of Ohio associate coach Bob Motzko was named the inaugural head coach. Motzko had previously led the defunct North Iowa Huskies to the 1989 Junior A Championship and was an assistant to Herb Brooks at St. Cloud State University during the 1986–87 season. For Motzko, the plan was to "win as fast as possible" and recruit high-caliber players: "You do not win in this league without veterans and our first year we might not have many veterans. But I want to get at it right away." Motzko would recruit several key players that played an instrumental role in the success that was to come, including forwards J.B. Bittner, Dave Iannazzo, Chad LaRose, Thomas Vanek, James Massen, Marty Sertich and Joe Jensen; defenseman Jamie Mattie; and goaltenders Zack Sikich and David Bowen.

The Stampede were placed in the Western Division and played their inaugural game at home against the Cedar Rapids RoughRiders on September 24, 1999, to a sold-out crowd of 4,660 fans, including an estimated 2,000 season ticket holders. The team completed its inaugural season 37–17–4, the highest for a first-year expansion, and qualified for a Clark Cup playoff match-up against the Twin Cities Vulcans. The team was led by forward Rick Gorman, who finished the season scoring 68 points, 25 goals and 43 assists. Motzko was named general manager of the year and Gorman was named to the all-USHL first team. The following season the team found similar success as it qualified for back-to-back playoff appearances with a 40–14–2 record. The Stampede beat the RoughRiders in the first round before losing to eventual Clark Cup champions, the Omaha Lancers. Following the season, coach Motzko left the Stampede to pursue an assistant coach role at the University of Minnesota.

 The team's ownership elected to hire Stampede assistant coach Tony Gasparini, the son of now former USHL president Gino Gasparini, to fill the head coach role. Gasparini's team finished the 2001–02 season 35–21–5, earning the team's third playoff appearance in as many years against the Sioux City Musketeers. However, the organization was once again knocked out in the early rounds. In the same season, star forward Thomas Vanek set a league-leading, team record of 91 points in a season, with 46 goals and 45 assists in his final year with the team. The city of Sioux Falls hosted the 20th USHL Prospects All-Star Game, attended by National Hockey League (NHL) scouts, while the organization was awarded its first USHL Organization of the Year award.

The Stampede accumulated a 112–52–11 overall record in its first three years of operation; however, the team's top four scoring players from the previous season, including Vanek, would not return for the 2002–03 season. After 52 games, Coach Gasparini's 21–25–6 team was in the midst of a six-game losing streak and ranked last in goals allowed per game. The poor performance prompted the ownership group to relieve Gasparini from his coaching duties and appoint assistant coach Ted Belisle as interim head coach in an attempt to salvage the team's playoff chances. The team finished its remaining eight games 3–5–0. The Stampede failed to make the playoffs for the first time in franchise history with a 24–30–6 record while also accruing a total of 1404 penalty minutes, the most of any team that season. Belisle was not retained as head coach.

On April 21, 2003, the Stampede announced the hiring of former San Jose Sharks assistant coach Mark Kaufman as head coach for the 2003–04 season with the intent of making a more disciplined defensive team. However, the team suffered its worst season record to date, going 15–42–3. The following 2004–05 season allowed a franchise-high 252 goals over 60 games and the team failed to make the playoffs for the third consecutive season. The Stampede fired Kaufman on April 6, 2005, after posting a 42–70–8 record over two seasons.

Finding success and first Clark Cup championship: 2005–2012
In an attempt to reinvigorate the franchise, Sioux Falls hired former University of Minnesota player and St. Paul Vulcans head coach Kevin Hartzell for the 2005–06 season. Hartzell previously led the Vulcans to three Clark Cup final appearances, including a championship during the 1983–84 season, and posted a 195–83–8 record overall between 1983 and 1989.

In his first year with the team, Hartzell led the club to a 43–13–4 record, its only Anderson Cup title, awarded to the team with the league's highest regular-season win percentage, and first division championship. The team was led by future NHL players Andreas Nödl, Nate Prosser and Ryan Thang; and the goaltender tandem of John Murray and Alex Kangas. The Stampede defense finished first overall in the USHL and set a franchise record for fewest goals allowed in a season with 135. Seven players were selected for the 2006 USHL All-Star/Prospects game in Sioux City, Iowa, and the team swept the Tri-City Storm and defeated the Lincoln Stars before advancing to their first Clark Cup championship appearance. The club was defeated by the Des Moines Buccaneers in a best-of-five series, 3–2. The team ended the 2005–06 season with a franchise best 21–7–2 home record and 22–6–2 away record, including a franchise-high win streak of 16 games.

Expectations were high for Hartzell's sophomore year, but the team found itself near the bottom of the standings much of the first half of the season after starting the previous season 27–3–0. The team built momentum by going 16–5–1 in the months of January and February and managed to enter the 2006–07 playoffs as the fourth and final seed in the West Division. The Stampede swept the Lincoln Stars in four games in the first round, but lost to the Des Moines Buccaneers in the first game of a two-game, second-round round robin. The Stampede defeated the Tri-City Storm in overtime in their second game and advanced to the final four, single-elimination tournament. The team defeated the top seeded Indiana Ice, who were undefeated up to that point in the playoffs, 3–2 in overtime in the semi-final round. In their second Clark Cup Final appearance in as many years, the Stampede shutout the Black Hawks 3–0 to win their first Clark Cup championship. Goaltender Matt Lundin was named the Clark Cup Final most valuable player. Future NHL player Corey Tropp led the team in scoring with 26 goals, 32 assists for 58 points, including a team-leading 13 points, four goals and nine assists in the playoffs.

Returning for Hartzell's third season were veteran forwards Nick Dineen, David Grun, Jake Hansen, Robbie Vrolyk and newcomer Jack Connolly, the seventh overall pick of the 2007 USHL Entry Draft. Finding similar success in previous seasons, Hartzell employed another goaltender tandem composed of his son, Eric Hartzell, and veteran Max Strang. The team finished the season 35–19–6, earning a third consecutive playoff berth, while Hartzell set a franchise-high five shutouts in the regular season. After sweeping the Lincoln Stars in the first round the previous season, the Stars returned the favor and shutout Sioux Falls 3–0. First-year forward Connolly led the league in scoring, finishing with 26 goals and 46 assists for 72 points. Connolly was named the 2007–08 season USHL Rookie of the Year and USA Hockey Player of the Year.

During the 2008–09 season, the Stampede finished 28–28–4, qualified for the playoffs and was again defeated by the Lincoln Stars. The club was led by forwards Terry Broadhurst and David Eddy. The following season was matched with similar success as the team finished 33–25–12, but, for the third consecutive season, was knocked out of the playoffs in the first round. The club had one of the most potent offenses in team history, ranking fourth in goals for with 223. The offensive output was led by forwards Michael Voran and Matt Lindblad and defenseman Chad Ruhwedel. Goaltender Clay Witt recorded six regular season shutouts, breaking the record previously held by Hartzell two seasons prior.

The team's previous failure to move beyond the first round became a point of consternation among fans. After finishing the 2010–11 season 34–20–6, the Stampede defeated rival Sioux City Musketeers 2–1 and Omaha Lancers 3–0 and advanced to face the Dubuque Fighting Saints in the Western Conference Championship. The club found success in a balanced attack with no true standouts, as eight different players tallied 30 points or more. The Fighting Saints bested Sioux Falls 3–1 in a best-of-five series. The playoff run would be the last of Hartzell's career as the team finished the 2011–12 season 17–36–7, the second worst record in team history.

On May 1, 2012, the Sioux Falls Stampede ownership group of Sioux Falls Sports, LLC. sold a majority stake in the team to SD Sports and Entertainment.  The new ownership group subsequently fired Hartzell six days later. He is the winningest coach in team history with a 224–152–44 record over seven seasons.

Second and third Clark Cup championships: 2012–2021

On May 11, 2012, five days after firing coach Hartzell, the new ownership group hired former University of North Dakota assistant coach Cary Eades. Eades previously spent 15 years over two stints with the program, earning four NCAA Frozen Four appearances and a national championship in 1987. He also spent two seasons as the head coach of the now defunct Dubuque Fighting Saints (1980–2001), going 86–46–7 and winning a National Tournament Championship in 1992. In his first season as head coach in 2012–13, Eades led the club to its best regular season performance finishing 45–17–2, six points shy of a second Anderson Cup title.

The 2014–15 season was highly anticipated by the city of Sioux Falls, as the Stampede debuted their new home, the recently constructed Denny Sanford Premier Center. On October 11, 2014, three weeks into the season, the club hosted the Waterloo Black Hawks to a sold-out crowd of 10,678 for their first game in the facility, recorded as the largest indoor sporting event in South Dakota history. The team started the season inconsistent, failing to string together wins and approached the halfway point of the season towards the bottom of the standings with an 11–12–3 record. Following the holiday break, the Stampede put together several winning streaks, finished a promising 32–23–5 and managed to clinch the fourth and final playoff spot. The Stampede faced and defeated the regular season Western Conference leading Sioux City Musketeers in a best-of-five series, 3–2. In the second round, after losing the first game, the Stampede put together three consecutive victories, including a shutout by goaltender Stefanos Lekkas, to earn their first conference championship against the second seeded Tri-City Storm. In their third Clark Cup final appearance, the Stampede completed a 3–0 sweep of the Muskegon Lumberjacks on home ice to earn their second Clark Cup championship. Forward Troy Loggins was named the Clark Cup playoffs most valuable player, tallying 16 points in 12 games played. Rookie forward Kieffer Bellows led the team in scoring with 33 goals and 19 assists for 52 points in 58 games, a Tier I junior rookie record for a 16-year-old, including three hat-tricks. The performance earned him USHL Rookie of the Year honors and a spot on the USHL All-third Team and All-rookie Team.

Less than a week after winning a Clark Cup championship, head coach Eades departed the club citing contract extension issues to take the vacant head coach position with the Fargo Force.

On May 21, 2015, the Stampede hired former Colorado College head coach Scott Owens. Owens previously spent 15 seasons with the program for a combined 324-228-62 regular-season record. Prior to his time with the Tigers, he spent four seasons with the Des Moines Buccaneers between 1995 and 1999 and the Madison Capitols between 1986 and 1990, earning a USHL playoff appearance in each season, two Anderson Cup championships, and a Clark Cup championship in 1999.

On May 17, 2019, the Stampede defeated the Chicago Steel in a three-game sweep for its third Clark Cup championship in team history. The team finished the 2019 Clark Cup playoffs with an 11–1 record.

Head coach Scott Owens announced his retirement from coaching on March 26, 2020, after spending five seasons with the club. The ownership group filled the roles left by Owens with former Minot Minotauros general manager and head coach Marty Murray on April 28, 2020. Murray led the North American Hockey League (NAHL) club to a combined 254–194–44 record over eight seasons, including a division championship in 2016–17 and a 2018 Robertson Cup runner-up finish. He was named NAHL General Manager of the Year after the 2018–19 campaign.

In his first season with the team, Murray finished with an 18–32–4 record and failed to qualify for the Clark Cup playoffs for the sixth time in club history. At the league trade deadline, on February 22, 2021, the Stampede were 15–15–3 and four points out of second place in the Western Conference. The Herd lost several key players to long-term injuries, including top-scoring defenseman Brent Johnson, and would finish 3–17–1 in the final 21 games. Rookie forward Cole Sillinger led the team in scoring with 24 goals and 22 assists for 46 points in 31 games played. Sillinger was acquired on one-year loan from the Medicine Hat Tigers due to coronavirus pandemic restrictions in Canada.

Team information

Logos and uniforms
The official primary colors of the Sioux Falls Stampede are navy and gold with the secondary colors black and white. The primary logo is a navy circle with a gold trim with a white and black buffalo silhouette at the forefront. Above the oval is the word mark "SIOUX FALLS" and below "STAMPEDE." The secondary logo is a blue buffalo charging through a cloud of smoke with the left hoof in the forefront. Above the buffalo is the word mark "SIOUX FALLS" and below "STAMPEDE." From team inception to sometime prior to the 2005–06 season, the current secondary logo served as the primary logo and vice versa. Both logos were created by Paulsen Marketing in Sioux Falls.

Mascot
On September 10, 1999, the Stampede placed an ad in the Argus Leader asking fans to assist in naming the new team's mascot. On September 21, the team unveiled the official mascot as a blue American bison called Stomp at a community gathering. Jolee Thurn is credited with naming the buffalo. Stomp wears a team jersey, black hockey helmet, navy hockey pants, ice skates while skating and black shoes. The mascot received an updated physical look prior to the 2014–15 season.

Broadcasting

Radio and television
Radio coverage is provided by flagship station KELO (AM 1320). The Stampede radio broadcast team is led by Jim Olander and in-studio host Ray Crockett. The radio network broadcasts pregame coverage, games with commentary, guest appearances by coachers and players, and postgame wrap-ups.

Season-by-season record
United States Hockey League

Players

Current roster
As of September 21, 2022.

|}

Team captains

National Hockey League alumni

Franchise career leaders
These are the top franchise leaders in regular season points, goals, assists, points per game, games played, and goaltending wins as of the end of the 2020–21 season.

Awards
Hobey Baker Award
 Marty Sertich, Colorado College, 2005
 Jack Connolly, Minnesota Duluth, 2012

Mike Richter Award
 Jeremy Swayman, Maine, 2020

USHL Rookie of the Year
 Matt Ford, 2003–04
 Jack Connolly, 2007–08
 Kieffer Bellows, 2014–15
 Cole Sillinger, 2020–21

USHL Defenseman of the Year
 Jamie Mattie, 2000–01

Curt Hammer Award (Best reflects USHL goals, team and organization)
 Zach Redmond, 2006–07
 Ryan Siiro, 2012–13
 Will Dineen, 2020–21

Dave Tyler Junior Player of the Year Award (USA Hockey Top Junior Player)
 Jack Connolly, 2007–08

All-USHL First Team
 Rick Gorman, 1999–00
 Thomas Vanek, Jamie Mattie, James Massen, 2000–01
 Mike Vannelli, 2002–03
 Matt Ford, 2003–04
 Andreas Nödl, 2005–06
 Jack Connolly, 2007–08

All-USHL Second Team
 Jared Hanowski, 1999–00
 Mike Doyle, 2000–01
 Eric Przepiorka, 2001–02
 John Murray, Nate Prosser, 2005–06
 Jake Hansen, 2007–08
 Jaxson Stauber, 2019–20
 Cole Sillinger, Brent Johnson, 2020–21

All-USHL Third Team
 Kieffer Bellows, 2014–15
 Jack St. Ivany, 2017–18
 Max Crozier, 2018–19
 Sam Stange, 2019–20

USHL All-Rookie First Team
 Alex Kangas, 2005–06
 Jack Connolly, 2007–08
 David Eddy, 2008–09
 Tony Calderone, 2012–13
 Kieffer Bellows, 2014–15
 Ryan Johnson, 2018–19
 Evan Nause, 2019–20
 Cole Sillinger, Brent Johnson, 2020–21

USHL All-Rookie Second Team
 Anthony Romano, 2018–19

USHL Coach of the Year
 Kevin Hartzell, 2005–06
 Cary Eades, 2012–13

USHL General Manager of the Year
 Bob Motzko, 1999–00

USHL Organization of the Year
 2001–02, 2005–06, 2013–14, 2014–15, 2017–18,  2019–20

USHL 25th Anniversary Team
 Thomas Vanek, (1979–2004)

Head coaches
Asterisk (*) denotes number of Clark Cups won
 Bob Motzko, 1999–2001
 Tony Gasparini, 2001–2003
 Ted Belisle, 2003 (interim)
 Mark Kaufman, 2003–2005
 Kevin Hartzell, 2005–2012*
 Cary Eades, 2012–2015*
 Scott Owens, 2015–2020*
 Marty Murray, 2020–2022
 Eric Rud, (2022–present)

References

External links
 Sioux Falls Stampede Official Webpage

United States Hockey League teams
Sports in Sioux Falls, South Dakota
Ice hockey teams in South Dakota
Ice hockey clubs established in 1999
1999 establishments in South Dakota